Ian Richardson (1934 – 2007) was a Scottish actor.

Ian Richardson may also refer to:
Ian Richardson (Australian footballer) (born 1987), Australian rules football player
Ian Richardson (footballer, born 1964), English football (soccer) player
Ian Richardson (footballer, born 1970), English football (soccer) player and manager

See also
Ian Richards (disambiguation)